The World Universities Debating Championship in Spanish or Campeonato Mundial Universitario de Debate en Español (CMUDE) is the world's largest and most important debating tournament in Spanish.

It is a parliamentary debating event, held using the British Parliamentary Debate format. The tournament the winners of the open competition are acknowledged as the "World Champions" of debating in Spanish.

The 2016 tournament was held at Universidad de Córdoba in Spain. The 2017 edition will be held at Universidad Francisco Marroquín in Guatemala.

Format
The Championship is held in the Northern Hemisphere summer.

The competition involves nine preliminary rounds, which become power-paired as the tournament progresses, matching the strongest-performing teams against each other. Two teams form the government (proposition in the UK and North America) and two the opposition in each debate room. The process of scoring and pairing these teams is known as tabbing. The scoring of teams is done by judges, most of whom are students or former students from the competing institutions, who return ballots with their scores to the adjudication team, led by a Chief Adjudicator who is assisted by one or more deputies.

The nine preliminary rounds are followed by a break at which the teams proceeding to elimination rounds are announced. In the current tournament format, 32 teams proceed to the octo-finals, with the best 2 from each debate qualifying for the quarter-finals, and the best 2 of each quarter-final subsequently proceed to the semi-finals, and the best 2 of each semi-final subsequently proceed to the Grand Final.

In addition, a public speaking competition is also open to all participants in CMUDE. Since edition held in México in 2014 a Nation's World Cup and a Spanish As a Second Language tournament were introduced.

Particularities

There are some differences with the English-speaking version of the tournament. One of them is that there is no limit on the number of teams that a university may register to the tournament as long as they fulfill the "n-1" rule, where "n" represents the number of teams they bring to the tournament and "n-1" is the number of judges they need to provide.

México 2014 introduced a Nations World Cup. While in English Worlds usually this competition is not taken on a serious manner, in the Spanish-speaking version it was envisioned for just one team per nation but the format has also evolved each year, and sometimes more than one team per nation have been allowed, or "humor" has been considered one of the evaluating elements in 2015 and 2019.

Composite teams are allowed at times, usually when there is no other way of guaranteeing participation for students from a university.

The "language status" tournament also has a key difference with Worlds. While Worlds' "ESL" and "EFL" tournaments are only for the teams that were not able or decide not to break into the Open tournament, the "Español como Segunda Lengua" (Spanish As Second Language) competition features a break of all teams eligible due to their language condition regardless of their performance on the main break, thus crowning the outright "Spanish As a Second Language" world champions.

Some editions have given focus to social service, including a full day was dedicated to teach debate to local students in 2014,.

Past Champions and Hosts

World Universities Championship

*One speaker was Mexican (Alatorre López) and one US American (Garcia), but both Cornell students.

Best Speakers

Performance by country

Updated until Peru 2019.

The students did not have ties to an institution from Hong Kong.

Judges' Cup / Nations Cup

Judges' Cup Speakers

Spanish As A Second Language

See also
 World Universities Debating Championship
 European Universities Debating Championship
 North American Debating Championship
 Australasian Intervarsity Debating Championships

References

External links
 World Debate Website – General World Universities Debating Championship information page
 World Debating Website – General World Universities Debating Championship information page
 Psikolojik Danışman
 CMUDE 2011 Stats - 2011 CMUDE statistics page
 2011 CMUDE website - 2011 CMUDE website
  
 :es:Concurso Mundial Universitario de Debate en Español (CMUDE)

Debating competitions
Student events